The World Triathlon Championship Series is World Triathlon's annual series of triathlon events used to crown an annual world champion since 2008.  There are multiple rounds of competitions culminating in a Grand Final race. Athletes compete head-to-head for points in these races that will determine the overall World Triathlon champion. The elite championship races are held, with one exception, over two distances, the standard or 'Olympic' distance (1.5 km swim, 40 km bike, 10 km run) and the sprint distance (750 m swim, 20 km bike, 5 km run). The ITU (the former name of World Triathlon) world champion between 1989 and 2008 had been decided in a single annual championship race.

Since 2018 a mixed relay series has been run in tandem, where national teams compete in mixed team relays for prize money and Olympic qualifying points. From these races, one is denominated as the World Triathlon Mixed Relay Championships. 

Since 2021 the leg holding the Mixed Relay Championships has also included the reinstated World Triathlon Sprint Championships under the combined branding of World Triathlon Sprint & Relay Championships. The stand-alone Sprint championship had previously been discontinued in 2011. Races in the sprint world championships are held over Super-sprint distances (300 m swim, 5 km bike, 2.5 km run) using a multi-race eliminator format which is unique to that leg.

The final leg of the series is marketed as the Grand Final, and has a greater points allocation, which must be included in the athletes final score ranking for the season along with the four best other results. In addition, the week of the Grand Final also sees age-grade World Championships in one-off races, including an under-23 title considered an elite event, as well as single-race para triathlon championship events.

History

With the establishment of the International Triathlon Union (ITU, now World Triathlon) in 1989 it was quickly established that the governing body should host a yearly world championship to establish the men's and women's world champion. With the creation and hosting of the first ITU Triathlon World Championship in 1989 the ITU had established itself and the sports premier event but the sport overall lacked cohesion with races of varying lengths and prize pools, which increased the difficulty for triathletes to train and plan for seasons ahead. So in 1991 the ITU created the ITU Triathlon World Cup a year long series of races all hosted by the ITU with regular distances  and prize money. With a world championship and a regular season established the ITU's  attention moved onto other issues including earning the sport a place at the Olympics.

Then in 2008 the day after the 2008 men's Olympic triathlon race the ITU announced starting next year it would be replacing the single race world championship with a six-race World Championship points super series culminating in a Grand Final, it was to be called the World Championship Series (WCS). The ITU believed it would help grow the sport and increase the reach to the level of major sports whilst gaining a bigger TV audience. Most athletes and professional coaches were happy at the announcement believing it would help the sport become more popular and increase professionalism and pay for the top level athletes. However, there were major monetary concerns one week after the announcement as the ITUs main sponsor BG had pulled out of its nine-year sponsorship deal after only two years.

By its start in 2009 the series had gained a title sponsor in Dextro Energy in a $2 million deal allowing for each World Championship event to feature a $150,000 prize purse and for the Grand final to have  $250,000, this also meant that $700,000 was available at the end of the series. This influx of cash meant that athletes would be to earn almost triple what they had previously helping to draw more into the sport. In 2011 the sprint distance world championship was incorporated into the series giving the same points and prize money as any other event, from this point on sprint distance events would make up a part of the series. In 2012 Dextro Energy ended their title sponsorship in tandem with the series rebranding itself as the World Triathlon Series. Then in 2013 the prize pool saw an increase to $2.25 million certifying the world triathlon series as the  richest series in triathlon. In 2018 with the growing popularity of the World Triathlon Mixed Relay Championships and the disciplines' addition to the Olympic program  it was decided that at three of the events on the 2018 calendar a mixed relay event would be held alongside the men's and women's competition; these three events would grant points towards Olympic qualification and constitute the new mixed relay series.

Only two triathletes succeeded in winning World Championships under both formats, Javier Gomez of Spain, and Helen Jenkins (née Tucker) of Great Britain and Wales. In 2020, in response to multiple race cancellations as a result of COVID-19 the Championship was once more decided on the basis of a single Championship race, won by Vincent Luis of France and Georgia Taylor-Brown of Great Britain and England. As Luis had already won a world title in 2019 under the now established season-long format, he in effect became only the third triathlete to win World Championships in both the single race and season-long formats.

Disciplines
Currently there are three different distance disciplines:
Standard- A 1500m swim followed by a 40 km cycle followed by a 10 km run.
Sprint- A 750m swim followed by a 20 km cycle followed by a 5 km run.
Mixed Team Relay- A 4 x ( 300m swim followed by a 7.5 km cycle followed by a 1.5 km run) where each athlete completes the swim bike run before tagging the next athlete,  with the order of the athletes always being female, male, female, male.

In all instances the swim will be a mass start in open-water and the cycling will be  draft-legal. There is an allowed leniency of 10% on each segment of courses route for the standard and sprint distances, with more discretion being allowed for the mixed relay. The standard distance was also known as the Olympic distance as it was the only distance competed for in the Olympics, however the World Triathlon has tried to enforce the use of the name standard distance saving the name Olympic on for official Olympic events.

Champions

Men's championship

 The athlete won his first title as World Champion under the old world championship system.

 The championship was restricted to a single race event due to COVID 19.

Women's championship

 The athlete won the title of World Champion under the old world championship system.

 The championship was restricted to a single race event due to COVID 19.

Medals classification

Hosts

World Triathlon Series locations

The World Triathlon Series has visited 27 cities in 19 countries since its founding in 2009.

Where  GF = Grand Final,  MR = Mixed Relay event

World Triathlon Series Grand Final locations

The final race of each season is known as the grand final and has extra points, prize money and prestige associated with it, when a city bids to host the grand final it also bids to host many World Triathlon events such as the amateur Age-group world championships and the Paratriathlon world championship.

*2020 Series was cancelled due to COVID-19 pandemic. Champion was determined during a single sprint race event in Hamburg, Germany.

ITU Triathlon World Championship

The world champion was formerly crowned in the ITU Triathlon World Championship, a single championship race that was held annually from 1989, the same year as the formation of the International Triathlon Union (ITU), to 2008.

Results

Men's championship

Women's championship

Medal table

Host city

See also

 World Triathlon Aquathlon Championships
 World Triathlon Cup
 World Triathlon Duathlon Championships
 World Triathlon Long Distance Championships
 World Triathlon Mixed Relay Championships

References

External links

 
Recurring sporting events established in 1989
Sports competition series
Recurring sporting events established in 2009
World championships of World Triathlon